Bernardi is an Italian surname. Notable people with the surname include:

Adria Bernardi, American novelist and translator
Andrew Bernardi (born 1965), British violinist, music entrepreneur, educationalist, and festival director    
Antonino de Bivona-Bernardi (1774 or 1778–1837), Sicilian botanist, bryologist and phycologist
Christina Bernardi (born 1990), Australian footballer
Christine Bernardi (1955–2018), French mathematician
Clothilde de Bernardi (born 1994), French tennis player
Cory Bernardi (born 1969), Australian politician
Daniel Bernardi (born 1964), American scholar and filmmaker
Danny Bernardi (born 1966), British writer
Enrico Bernardi (1841–1919), Italian inventor of the gasoline internal-combustion engine
Ernani Bernardi (1911–2006), American politician
Fabrizio Bernardi (born 1972), Italian astronomer
Francesco Bernardi (painter), also known as Bigolaro (first half of the 17th century), Italian painter
Frank Bernardi (born 1933), American football player
Georges Bernardi (1922–1999), French entomologist
Giacomo Bernardi, American biologist
Giuliano Bernardi (1939–1977), Italian opera singer
Giuseppe Bernardi (1694–1773), also called Torretto, Italian sculptor
Guido Bernardi (1921–2002), Italian cyclist
Herschel Bernardi (1923–1986), American actor
José Oscar Bernardi (born 1954), Brazilian football player
Laurent Bernardi (born 1988) French football player
Lorenzo Bernardi (born 1968), Italian volleyball player
Lucas Bernardi (born 1977), Argentinian football player
Mario Bernardi (1930–2013), Canadian conductor and pianist
Mario de Bernardi (1893–1959), Italian pilot
Nicolas Bernardi (born 1976), French rally driver
Nerio Bernardi (1899–1971), Italian film actor
Paloma Bernardi (born 1985), Brazilian actress, entrepreneur, dancer and radio presented
Paolo Bernardi, Italian pathologist
Piero De Bernardi (1926–2010), Italian screenwriter
Roy Bernardi (born 1942), American public servant

See also
Berardi
Bernardini

Surnames of Italian origin
Germanic-language surnames
Patronymic surnames